Uncut is the debut studio album released by Canada's the Powder Blues. It was originally released in December 1979 on the Blue Wave label. RCA re-issued the album in February 1980, with the song "Gimme Some Lovin'" removed from the album. Uncut was produced by Jack Lavin.

The album was nominated at the 1981 Juno Awards for "Album of the Year", and the band won the Juno Award for "Most Promising Group of the Year" the same year.

Track listing
"Boppin' with the Blues" (Tom Lavin) – 3:17
"Hear That Guitar Ring" (Jack Lavin, T. Lavin) – 3:43
"Just a Little" (Bass, Brown, Thorton, Washington) – 3:36
"The Rockchopper" (Powder Blues) – 3:29
"Doin' It Right" (T. Lavin) – 3:15
"Buzzard Luck" (Wynonie Harris) – 3:00
"What've I Been Drinkin'" (J. Lavin) – 3:14
"Personal Manager" (Albert King, D. Porter) – 6:29
"Sweet Little Girl" (T. Lavin, D. Maxwell) – 3:30
"Gimme Some Lovin'" (original Blue Wave release only)

Personnel
 Tom Lavin – guitar, vocals
 Jack Lavin – bass, vocals
 Duris Maxwell – drums
 Willie MacCalder – piano, keyboards, organ, vocals
 Wayne Kozak – tenor saxophone
 Dave Woodward – tenor saxophone, vocals
 Gord Bertram – baritone saxophone
 Gabriel Mark Hasselbach – trumpet

Chart

Certifications

References

1979 albums
Powder Blues Band albums